The following is a list of mobile phones with a high refresh rate display. The refresh rate is the number of times in a second that a display hardware updates its buffer. It is not to be confused with the touch response rate, which is the frequency that the touchscreen senses input, or the frame rate, which describes how many images are stored or generated every second by the device driving the display.  The first smartphone released with a high refresh rate was the Razer Phone, released in November 2017.

90 Hz

120 Hz

144+ Hz

References 

high refresh rate display